Neny Fjord is a fjord which is  long in an east–west direction and  wide, between Red Rock Ridge and Roman Four Promontory on the west coast of Graham Land, Antarctica.

Geography
Mount Dudley

History 
This coast was first explored in 1909 by Jean-Baptiste Charcot who, it appears, gave this name to a feature somewhat north of the bay described. The British Graham Land Expedition (BGLE) made a detailed survey of this area in 1936–1937, and in correlating their work with that of Charcot applied the name Neny Fjord to the bay between Red Rock Ridge and Roman Four Promontory. The name has become established in this latter position through international acceptance and use.

Further reading 
  Damien Gildea, Antarctic Peninsula - Mountaineering in Antarctica: Travel Guide

External links 

 Neny Fjord on USGS website
 Neny Fjord on SCAR website
 Neny Fjord area satellite image

References

A Holocene Paleoclimatic history from Neny Fjord, Antarctic Peninsula at Harvard.edu
Neny, Seno at Australian Antarctic Data Centre

Fjords of Antarctica
Bodies of water of Graham Land
Fallières Coast